Islip may refer to:

Places

England 
Islip, Northamptonshire
Islip, Oxfordshire

United States 
Islip, New York, a town in Suffolk County
Islip (hamlet), New York, located in the above town
Central Islip, New York, a hamlet and census-designated place located in the above town
East Islip, New York, a hamlet and census-designated place located in the above town
Islip Terrace, New York, a hamlet and census-designated place located in the above town
West Islip, New York, a hamlet and census-designated place located in the above town
Long Island MacArthur Airport, formerly known as Islip Airport, in the above town

Mount Islip, a mountain in California

Other uses
Islip (surname)
Islip railway station, Oxfordshire